"Baby Baby" is a 1995 song by Italian band Corona, released as the second single from their debut album, The Rhythm of the Night (1995). It is a cover of Joy & Joyce's 1991 hit, "Babe Babe", and both tracks were produced by Lee Marrow. Particularly devoted to the dance floors, it was very successful on the singles charts around the world, peaking at number-one in Italy, and the RPM Dance/Urban chart in Canada. In the UK, it peaked at number five for two weeks. On Attitudes list of The Top 10 Dance Tunes Of The '90s in 2016, it was ranked number six. 

In 2007, also Swedish dance group Sunblock made a cover of the song, which peaked at number one in Spain and number four in Finland.

Critical reception
AllMusic editor Jose F. Promis described the song as the "aggressive" follow-up to "The Rhythm of the Night", picking it as one of the standout tracks on the album. Larry Flick from Billboard wrote that it "steamrolls down a similar Euro-NRG dance/pop path." He added, "Although the airwaves are now flooded with similarly giddy fare, this jampacks a chorus that is insistently contagious—and it is voiced with a fullthrottle diva energy. To that end, both radio and club tastemakers should climb aboard early." Swedish newspaper Expressen said that it is "at least as good" as their first single.

Dave Sholin from the Gavin Report noted that "it took awhile for some to come to the party on "Rhythm Of The Night", but they were happy with the results. This pumpin', thumpin' follow-up will keep 'em dancing and create the same excitement." Alan Jones from Music Week described "Baby Baby" as "a storming house/Nu-NRG track that has already soared to the apex of RMs On A Pop Tip chart. If it charts lower than top five, I'll be very surprised." James Hamilton from the RM Dance Update declared it as "more squawking simple Italo catchiness". Pop Rescue called it "an absolute feel-good euro belter".

Chart performance
"Baby Baby" was very successful on the charts in Europe, peaking at number-one in Italy in April 1995, as well as on the European Dance Radio Chart. It also reached the top 10 in Denmark (four), Finland, France, Iceland, Ireland, Norway, Scotland (three), Spain (two), Sweden and the UK. In the latter, it peaked at number five on April 9, 1995, in its second week on the UK Singles Chart. The single stayed on that position for two weeks. On the UK Dance Chart, the song reached number four, while peaking at number one on the UK on a Pop Tip Club Chart. On the Eurochart Hot 100, it also peaked at number five. Outside Europe, it reached number one on the Canadian RPM Dance/Urban chart, number seven in Australia, number 22 in New Zealand and was a top 10 hit in Israel. In the US, "Baby Baby" peaked at number 39 on the Cash Box Top 100 and number 57 on the Billboard Hot 100. But on the Billboard Hot Dance Club Play chart and Rhythmic Top 40 chart, the song was an even bigger hit, reaching number five and three.

Music video
Two different music videos were made for "Baby Baby"; a European version and an US version. One of them was directed by Mark Humphrey.

Video 1
It features frontwoman Olga de Souza attending a party in the disused Aldwych tube station in London. The video was later published on RDS Music Label's official YouTube channel in August 2011. It has amassed more than 8,7 million views as of September 2021.

Video 2
An overweight man is watching TV and switching from one channel to another with a remote control. Suddenly Olga appears on the screen, singing the chorus. When the music starts, he suddenly finds himself lying on a big bed with her. It has a headboard shaped as giant lips and she crawls on the bed, singing to him. Apparently frightened by this, he looks for an exit and tries to escape through a closed door. But behind the door, two women are standing. He is then placed in a chair, while the women are teasing and trying to seduce him. In the end, the man is seen smiling, with lipstick kiss-marks all over his head. A re-edited version of this video omits all footage of the man. It was later published on RHINO's official YouTube channel in April 2014. The video has received more than 4,5 million views as of October 2022.

Track listings

Corona version
 CD single
 "Baby Baby" (Lee Marrow Radio Mix) (3:45)
 "Baby Baby" (Robyx Piano Remix Short Edit) (3:55)

 CD-maxi
 "Baby Baby" (Lee Marrow Radio Mix) (3:45)
 "Baby Baby" (Robyx Piano Remix Short Edit) (3:55)
 "Baby Baby" (Dancing Divaz Club Mix) (6:07)
 "Baby Baby" (Lee Marrow Extended Mix) (5:55)
 "Baby Baby" (Robyx Piano Remix) (5:39)
 "Baby Baby" (Dancing Divaz Rhythm Mix) (5:45)

 7-inch single
 "Baby Baby" (Lee Marrow Radio Mix) (3:45)
 "Baby Baby" (Robyx Piano Remix Short Edit) (3:55)

 7-inch maxi
 "Baby Baby" (Lee Marrow Extended Mix) (5:55)
 "Baby Baby" (Robyx Piano Remix) (5:39)
 "Baby Baby" (Dancing Divaz Club Mix) (6:07)
 "Baby Baby" (Dancing Divaz Rhythm Mix) (5:45)

Sunblock version
 CD-maxi
 "Baby Baby" (Radio Edit)
 "Baby Baby" (Extended Version)
 "Baby Baby" (The Audiophiles Remix)
 "Baby Baby" (Ian Carey Remix)
 "Baby Baby" (DJ DLG Remix)
 "Baby Baby" (Friday Night Posse Remix)
 "Baby Baby" (Frisco Remix)
 "Baby Baby" (Audiophiles Remix)

Personnel
 Written by Francesco Bontempi and Antonia Bottari
 Published by Many Edizioni Musicali - B. Mikulski Publ. - SFR Music
 Created, arranged and produced by Checco and Maurizio Silvestri ITA & Soul Train for a Lee Marrow production
 Engineered by Francesco Alberti at Casablanca Recordings (Italy)
 'Lee Marrow Radio Mix' and 'Lee Marrow Extended Mix' : Additional editing by Robyx
 'Robyx Piano Remix Short Edit' and 'Robyx Piano Remix' : Remixed and reconstructed by Robyx
 'Dancing Divaz Club Mix' and 'Dancing Divaz Rhythm Mix' 
 Remix and additional editing by production by Dancing Divaz
 Additional keyboards by Colin Thorpe

Charts

Weekly charts
Corona version

Sunblock version

Year-end charts
Corona version

Certifications

References

1991 songs
1995 singles
Corona (band) songs
Eurodance songs
Number-one singles in Italy
Number-one singles in Spain
ZYX Music singles